Cumbernauld and Kilsyth (Gaelic: Comar nan Allt agus Cill Saidh) is a constituency of the Scottish Parliament (Holyrood) covering part of the council area of North Lanarkshire. It elects one Member of the Scottish Parliament (MSP) by the plurality (first past the post) method of election. It is also one of nine constituencies in the Central Scotland electoral region, which elects seven additional members, in addition to nine constituency MSPs, to produce a form of proportional representation for the region as a whole.

The seat has been held by Jamie Hepburn of the Scottish National Party since the 2011 Scottish Parliament election.

Electoral region 

The other eight constituencies of the Central Scotland Scottish Parliament region are Airdrie and Shotts, Coatbridge and Chryston, East Kilbride, Falkirk East, Falkirk West, Hamilton, Larkhall and Stonehouse, Motherwell and Wishaw and Uddingston and Bellshill.

The region covers all of the Falkirk council area, all of the North Lanarkshire council area and part of the South Lanarkshire council area.

Constituency boundaries and council area 

The constituency was created at the same time as the Scottish Parliament, in 1999, with the name and boundaries of an  existing Westminster constituency. In 2005, however, Scottish Westminster (House of Commons) constituencies were mostly replaced with new constituencies. Holyrood constituencies were themselves reviewed ahead of the 2011 Scottish Parliament election, however Cumbernauld and Kilsyth was left unaltered, being the only mainland seat to remain unchanged during this review.

Cumbernauld and Kilsyth is one of four covering the North Lanarkshire council area, the others being Airdrie and Shotts, Coatbridge and Chryston, and Motherwell and Wishaw; Uddingston and Bellshill spans parts of both North and South Lanarkshire. All five are within the Central Scotland electoral region.

The electoral wards used in the creation of Cumbernauld and Kilsyth are:

In full: Cumbernauld East, Cumbernauld North, Cumbernauld South, Kilsyth

Member of the Scottish Parliament

Election results

2020s

2010s

2000s

1990s

Footnotes

External links

Constituencies of the Scottish Parliament
Scottish Parliament constituencies and regions from 2011
1999 establishments in Scotland
Constituencies established in 1999
Scottish Parliament constituencies and regions 1999–2011
Cumbernauld
Kilsyth
Politics of North Lanarkshire